Balamba is a town in Katanga Province in the Democratic Republic of the Congo.

Demographics 
In 2012 it had a population of 55,641 inhabitants, and in 2004 it had 47,213.

See also 

 List of cities in the Democratic Republic of the Congo

References 

Populated places in Haut-Katanga Province